Ikechukwu Somtochukwu Diogu  (born September 11, 1983) is a Nigerian-American professional basketball player for Piratas de La Guaira of the Superliga Profesional de Baloncesto in Venezuela.

Family and early life
Diogu's parents, natives of Nigeria, moved to the U.S. in 1980 to pursue further education. They later moved from Buffalo, New York, where he was born, to Garland, Texas. Ike attended Austin Academy, then enrolled at Garland High School. Diogu is a member of the Igbo ethnic group.

College career

Diogu attended Arizona State University, where he excelled on the team under head coach Rob Evans. He garnered several honors, both in the Pac-10 Conference and nationally. He won Pac-10 Freshman of the Year, and then Pac-10 Player of the Year in his final season with ASU, as a junior. Many speculated that Diogu would enter the draft after playing his third season with Arizona State. On June 21, 2005, he made the decision to enter the NBA draft.

On January 15, 2022, Diogu's number 5 jersey was retired by the Sun Devils. He was the first consensus All-American in program history.

Professional career

Diogu was selected 9th overall in the first round of the 2005 NBA draft by the Golden State Warriors. On December 23, 2005, he recorded a professional career-best 27 points on 13–15 shooting, surpassing his previous best by 12 points.

On January 17, 2007, Diogu, whom Larry Bird called the "gem" of the deal, was traded to the Indiana Pacers along with teammates Mike Dunleavy, Jr., Troy Murphy, and Keith McLeod for Stephen Jackson, Al Harrington, Šarūnas Jasikevičius, and Josh Powell.

On June 26, 2008 (draft night), Diogu was traded by Indiana to the Portland Trail Blazers along with the draft rights to Jerryd Bayless in exchange for Jarrett Jack, Josh McRoberts and the draft rights to Brandon Rush to the Indiana Pacers.

Diogu was traded to the Sacramento Kings for the Chicago Bulls' Michael Ruffin on February 18, 2009.

Diogu signed with the New Orleans Hornets on July 29, 2009, but never appeared in a game for the team.

He signed with the Detroit Pistons on September 27, 2010, becoming a member of their preseason roster. On October 20, 2010, Diogu was waived by the Pistons.

The Los Angeles Clippers signed Diogu as a free agent on December 22, 2010.
On February 8, 2011, Diogu scored a season-high 18 points against the Orlando Magic.

Diogu joined the San Antonio Spurs on January 3, 2012. One week later, the Spurs waived him.

During the 2012 CBA Playoffs, the Xinjiang Flying Tigers signed Diogu for the rest of the 2012 CBA Playoffs. Diogu was a replacement for Gani Lawal during this time. He later signed with Capitanes de Arecibo of the Baloncesto Superior Nacional.

On October 1, 2012, Diogu signed with the Phoenix Suns. He was then waived on October 24, 2012.

In the fall of 2012, Diogu signed with the Guangdong Southern Tigers of the Chinese Basketball Association. After the season in China, he joined the Leones de Ponce in Puerto Rico.

On September 27, 2013, Diogu signed with the New York Knicks. However, he was waived on October 25.

On December 12, 2013, he was acquired by the Bakersfield Jam.

On February 3, 2014, Diogu was named to the Prospects All-Star roster for the 2014 NBA D-League All-Star Game. On April 25, 2014, he was named the 2014 NBA D-League Impact Player of the Year.

On April 29, 2014, Diogu re-joined the Leones de Ponce of the Baloncesto Superior Nacional. This year Diogu helped the Lions to win the championship over the Capitanes of Arecibo.

On July 5, 2014, Diogu signed with the Dongguan Leopards of China for the 2014–15 CBA season.

In October 2015, Diogu signed with Guangdong Southern Tigers for the 2015–16 CBA season.

In November 2016, Diogu signed with the Jiangsu Monkey King for the purpose of replacing DeJuan Blair.

In January 2018, Diogu signed with the Sichuan Blue Whales for the purpose of replacing Jamaal Franklin.

In August 2019, Diogu joined the Shimane Susanoo Magic of the Japanese B.League.

In February 2021, Diogu joined Chemidor B.C. of the Iranian Basketball Super League.

In September 2021, Diogu joined the Astros de Jalisco of the Mexican Liga Nacional de Baloncesto Profesional.

On January 16, 2022, he signed with Zamalek of the Egyptian Basketball Super League. On February 12, Diogu made his debut scoring 8 points and 4 rebounds against Burgos in the semifinal of the 2022 FIBA Intercontinental Cup.

National team career
Diogu has played with the senior men's Nigeria national basketball team. He has competed at two Summer Olympiads: the 2012 and 2016. He was named MVP of the 2017 FIBA Afrobasket tournament after averaging 22 points, 8.7 rebounds.

NBA career statistics

Regular season

|-
| style="text-align:left;"| 
| style="text-align:left;"| Golden State
| 69 || 14 || 14.9 || .524 || .000 || .810 || 3.3 || .4 || .2 || .4 || 7.0
|-
| style="text-align:left;"| 
| style="text-align:left;"| Golden State
| 17 || 0 || 13.1 || .530 || .000 || .795 || 3.7 || .3 || .2 || .6 || 7.2
|-
| style="text-align:left;"| 
| style="text-align:left;"| Indiana
| 42 || 2 || 12.8 || .454 || .000 || .802 || 3.3 || .5 || .1 || .4 || 5.8
|-
| style="text-align:left;"| 
| style="text-align:left;"| Indiana
| 30 || 1 || 10.2 || .478 || .000 || .851 || 2.8 || .3 || .2 || .1 || 5.6
|-
| style="text-align:left;"| 
| style="text-align:left;"| Portland
| 19 || 0 || 3.8 || .316 || .000 || .750 || .9 || .0 || .1 || .1 || 1.4
|-
| style="text-align:left;"| 
| style="text-align:left;"| Sacramento
| 10 || 1 || 14.2 || .600 || .500 || .758 || 3.9 || .3 || .2 || .1 || 9.2
|-
| style="text-align:left;"| 
| style="text-align:left;"| L.A. Clippers
| 36 || 0 || 13.1 || .561 || .000 || .661 || 3.2 || .1 || .1 || .1 || 5.8
|-
| style="text-align:left;"| 
| style="text-align:left;"| San Antonio
| 2 || 0 || 7.0 || .000 || .000 || 1.000 || .5 || .0 || .0 || .0 || 1.0
|- class="sortbottom"
| style="text-align:center;" colspan="2"| Career
| 225 || 18 || 12.4 || .509 || .500 || .786 || 3.1 || .3 || .2 || .3 || 6.0

See also
History of Nigerian Americans in Dallas–Fort Worth

References

External links
 

Eurobasket.com profile
Arizona State Sun Devils bio

1983 births
Living people
2019 FIBA Basketball World Cup players
American men's basketball players
All-American college men's basketball players
American expatriate basketball people in China
American expatriate basketball people in Iran
American expatriate basketball people in Japan
American expatriate basketball people in Mexico
American people of Igbo descent
American sportspeople of Nigerian descent
Arizona State Sun Devils men's basketball players
Astros de Jalisco players
Bakersfield Jam players
Baloncesto Superior Nacional players
Basketball players at the 2003 Pan American Games
Basketball players at the 2012 Summer Olympics
Basketball players at the 2016 Summer Olympics
Basketball players from Buffalo, New York
Basketball players from Texas
Capitanes de Arecibo players
Centers (basketball)
Garland High School alumni
Golden State Warriors draft picks
Golden State Warriors players
Guangdong Southern Tigers players
Igbo sportspeople
Indiana Pacers players
Nanjing Tongxi Monkey Kings players
Leones de Ponce basketball players
Los Angeles Clippers players
New Orleans Hornets players
Nigerian expatriate basketball people in China
Nigerian expatriate basketball people in Iran
Nigerian expatriate basketball people in Japan
Nigerian men's basketball players
Olympic basketball players of Nigeria
Pan American Games competitors for the United States
People from Buffalo, New York
People from Garland, Texas
Portland Trail Blazers players
Power forwards (basketball)
Sacramento Kings players
Shenzhen Leopards players
Shimane Susanoo Magic players
Sichuan Blue Whales players
Sportspeople from the Dallas–Fort Worth metroplex
Xinjiang Flying Tigers players
Zamalek SC basketball players